Broad Street is a street in Aberdeen which joins Union Street in the southeast and the Gallowgate and Upperkirkgate in the northwest.

History 
Pedestrianisation of Broad Street was discussed in 2013, at which time a completion date of 2016 was predicted.

Pedestrianisation was approved in October 2016. Work to partly pedestrianise the street began in May 2017. It remains accessible to buses and cyclists in a shared space format. There has since been proposals to ban buses from the street.

Buildings 
On one side of the street is the Marischal Square development. On the other side is the Aberdeen Town House and Marischal College.

Events 
During winter months the street is closed for the Aberdeen Christmas Market.

References 

Streets in Aberdeen